Erica Lynn O' Keith (born December 19, 1984, in Los Angeles, California) is an actress best known for her role in the Nickelodeon sitcom Romeo!. She has also guest starred in Close to Home and Scrubs. She was also one of the girls on the bleachers in Corbin Bleu's music video for "Push It to the Limit".

During her free time she takes jazz, hip hop, and break dance lessons.

Filmography

References

External links

1984 births
21st-century American actresses
Living people
American television actresses
African-American actresses
Actresses from California
21st-century African-American women
20th-century African-American people
20th-century African-American women